Esohe, is a 2018 Nigerian epic fantasy thriller film co-directed by Charles Uwagbai and Robert O'Peters and co-produced by Robert O'Peters. The film stars Jemima Osunde in lead role along with Jimmy Jean-Louis. Oghenekaro Itene, Omo Godwyn Williams and Chris Attoh made supportive roles and an ensemble cast. The film revolves around Gary Barbar, who suffers repeated nightmares and later unveils as the reincarnation and reunion of Ifagbai, the son of Eghosa the Oba’s warrior, his long-lost lover, Esohe.

The film has been shot in Benin City, Nigeria. The film received mostly positive critical acclaim, and was screened worldwide. In 2018, at the Africa Movie Academy Awards, the film was nominated for five award categories: Best Actor in a Leading Role, Best Actress in a Supporting Role, Achievement in Visual Effect, Achievement in Make-up, and Achievement in Costume Design. In USA, the film became a blockbuster.

Cast
 Jemima Osunde as Esohe
 Jimmy Jean-Louis as Gary Babar
 Chris Attoh as Ifagbai
 Oghenekaro Itene as Itohan
 Omo Godwyn Williams as Chief Eghosa
 Toyin Abraham as Titilola 
 Precious Aibangbee as Efosa
 Kristy Butler as Tricia
 Solo Clinton as Civilized Villager
 Kyle Colton as Damian
 Omosigho Edward as Chief
 Aimienofona Efekomwan as Ehi
 Osagie Elegbe as Police officer
 Desmond Elliot as Johnny Payne
 Afolayan Eniola as Osagie
 Legemah Henry as Ezomo
 Michael Isokpan as Loot
 Emmanuel Issah as Police Man
 Opute Joel as Farmer
 Loveth Leonard as Receptionist
 Misty Lockheart as Claire
 Bimbo Manuel as Catechist
 Ufuoma McDermott as Eno
 Omo-Osaghie Utete Megiabi as Priest
 Ehigiator Joy Nosa as Abieyuwa
 Helen Enado Odigie as Queen
 Eunice Omorogie as Ohen
 Patience Omoruyi as Mama Patric
 Osayande Onaghise as Leader
 Andrew Otamere as Old man
 Joel Rogers as Professor James
 Igiebor Osagie Solution as Osa
 Monica Swaida as Esosa
 Omoye Uzamere as Iyen
 Margaret Madu Vilvens as Melissa

References

External links 
 

Nigerian thriller films
2018 films
2018 thriller films